The 2009 Tennis Napoli Cup was a professional tennis tournament played on outdoor red clay courts. It was part of the 2009 ATP Challenger Tour. It took place in Naples, Italy between 30 March and 5 April 2009.

Singles entrants

Seeds

Rankings are as of March 23, 2009.

Other entrants
The following players received wildcards into the singles main draw:
  Fabio Fognini
  Stefano Galvani
  Enrico Fioravante
  Giancarlo Petrazzuolo

The following players received entry from the qualifying draw:
  Federico Delbonis
  Oleksandr Dolgopolov Jr.
  Jan Hájek
  Florian Mayer

The following player received special exempt into the main draw:
  Andreas Haider-Maurer
  David Marrero

Champions

Men's singles

 Pablo Cuevas def.  Victor Crivoi, 6–1, 6–3

Men's doubles

 Pablo Cuevas /  David Marrero def.  Lukáš Rosol /  Frank Moser, 6–4, 6–3

External links
Official website
ITF search 

Tennis Napoli Cup
Tennis Napoli Cup
2009 in Italian tennis